The 1929 Rutgers Queensmen football team represented Rutgers University in the 1929 college football season. In their third season under head coach Harry Rockafeller, the Queensmen compiled a 5–4 record, finished in a three-way tie for the Middle Three Conference championship, and outscored their opponents 109 to 94.

Schedule

References

Rutgers
Rutgers Scarlet Knights football seasons
Rutgers Queensmen football